Bon Pastor is a neighbourhood in Sant Andreu, a district in the city of Barcelona. Since April 2010 it's served by the Barcelona Metro station Bon Pastor.

Neighbourhoods of Barcelona
Sant Andreu